Payday is a 2018 Nigerian comedy drama film directed by Cheta Chukwu and produced by Orwi Manny Ameh  with Kingsley Chukwu and Orwi Manny Ameh as its executive producers. The film stars Baaj Adebule, Bisola Aiyeola, Zack Orji, Victor Ebiye, Segilola Ogidan and Meg Otanwa. It was released on 13 July 2018 and premiered on Netflix on November 29, 2019.

Plot 
The theme of the film revolves around two best friends Paul and Ortega who just before renewing their annual rent, losses their landlord. And without an heir apparent, both decided to go 'enjoy a little' until the landlord's daughter Yemisola came by and gave them 24 hours to pay or quit. And this begin their race to provide the money in all interesting manner.

Cast 
 Baaj Adebule as Paul
 Victor Ebiye as Ortega
 Orwi Manny Ameh as Barrister Paul
 Zack Orji as Mr. Afolayan
 Bisola Aiyeola as Ngozi
 Meg Otanwa as Kimberley
 Segilola Ogidan as Yemisola Bankole

References

External links 
 
 

2018 films
English-language Nigerian films
2010s English-language films